"Sweeter and Sweeter" is a song written by Don Reid and Harold Reid, and recorded by American country music group The Statler Brothers.  It was released in November 1985 as the third single from their album Pardners in Rhyme.  The song peaked at number 8 on the Billboard Hot Country Singles chart.

Chart performance

References

1985 singles
1985 songs
The Statler Brothers songs
Mercury Records singles
Song recordings produced by Jerry Kennedy
Songs written by Don Reid (singer)
Songs written by Harold Reid